"Hold The Line" is a pop song performed by German singer Jeanette. The song was written by Frank Johnes, Bodybrain and Wonderbra, and produced by Tom Remm and Frank Kretschmer for Jeanette's fourth album Break On Through (2003). It was released as a single on 28 June 2004 in Germany.

Formats and track listings
These are the formats and track listings of major single releases of "Hold the Line".

CD single
(602498673737; Released )
"Hold the Line" (Radio edit) – 3:49
"Hold the Line" (Acoustic mix) – 3:40
"Himalaya" – 4:05
"Hold the Line" (Karaoke version) – 3:49
"No Eternity" (Acoustic version) – 3:44
"Hold the Line" music video

Charts

References

External links
Official website

2004 singles
2003 songs
Jeanette Biedermann songs
Songs written by Kristina Bach